The Austrian Northwestern Railway (German: Österreichische Nordwestbahn, ÖNWB, Czech: Rakouská severozápadní dráha) was the name of a former railway company during the time of the Austro-Hungarian monarchy. Today, the term is still used (although only rarely) to refer to the railway line which was formerly operated by that company.

The privately owned Nordwestbahn took over the branch of the Nordbahn from Floridsdorf to Stockerau in 1871 and extended it in 1871 via Hollabrunn and Retz to Znojmo (Moravia). Nordwestbahn owned and operated many important lines in Bohemia and Moravia. It was nationalized in 1908 and subsequently lost its significance. Nordwestbahnhof was closed down in 1924 and has only been used for freight transports since World War II. The bridge used by the company was transformed into an Autobahn bridge during the 60s. Passenger service between Retz and Znojmo was reopened in 1990.

Lines built by Nordwestbahn lying in today's Czech Republic  

 Golčův Jeníkov- Čáslav - Kolín (6. 12. 1869)
 Trutnov (Main station) - Trutnov (Poříčí) (29. 10. 1870)
 Nymburk Main station - Veleliby - Mladá Boleslav (Main station) (29. 10. 1870)
 Kolín - Velký Osek - Nymburk (Main Station) (29. 10. 1870)
 Havlíčkův Brod - Světlá nad Sázavou - Golčův Jeníkov (21. 12. 1870)
 Velký Osek - Chlumec nad Cidlinou - Ostroměř (21. 12. 1870)
 Kunčice nad Labem - Trutnov (Main station) (21. 12. 1870)
 Jihlava - Havlíčkův Brod (25. 1. 1871)
 Znojmo - Moravské Budějovice - Okříšky - Jihlava (23. 4. 1871)
 Havlíčkův Brod - Ždárec u Skutče - Chrast u Chrudimi - Chrudim - Pardubice (Rosice nad Labem) (1. 6. 1871)
 Pardubice (Main station) - Pardubice (Rosice nad Labem) (1. 6. 1871)
 Ostroměř - Stará Paka - Kunčice nad Labem (1. 6. 1871)
 Kunčice nad Labem - Vrchlabí (1. 10. 1871)
 Austria/Czech Republic border - Šatov - Znojmo (1. 11. 1871)
 Ostroměř - Jičín (Cargo station) (17. 12. 1871)
 Trutnov (Main station) - Svoboda nad Úpou (17. 12. 1871)
 Chlumec nad Cidlinou - Hradec Králové (4. 10. 1873)
 Nymburk - Lysá nad Labem - Čelákovice - Prague (Rohanský ostrov interim station) (4. 10. 1873)
 Lysá nad Labem - Všetaty - Mělník - Litoměřice (Lower station) - Ústí nad Labem (Střekov) - Ústí nad Labem (West station) (1. 1. 1874)
 Hradec Králové - Týniště nad Orlicí - Letohrad - Lichkov (10. 1. 1874)
 Letohrad - Ústí nad Orlicí (10. 1. 1874)
 Ústí nad Labem (Střekov) - Velké Březno - Děčín (East station) - Děčín (Prostřední Žleb)  (5. 10. 1874)
 Lichkov - Czech Republic/Poland border (15. 10. 1875)
 Prague (Rohanský ostrov interim station) - Prague (Těšnov station) (15. 10. 1875)

Notes 

Northwestern
Northwestern
Railway companies established in 1869
Northwestern
Northwestern
1869 establishments in Austria